Adelmo Paris (born 1954 in Cambiasca, Italy) was a professional footballer and Italian football coach.

Playing career
Paris joined Verbania in Serie C and then moved to Bologna, in which he won the Italian Cup (Coppa Italia) in season 1973-74. He made his Serie A debut with Bologna in a 2–1 loss to Vicenza on 10 February 1974. After a year with Brescia he returned to Bologna, and gained promotion to Serie B in 1983-84. During 1984-86, he joined Żurrieq, playing in the Maltese Premier League and helping Żurrieq win the Maltese Cup in 1985. He went back to Verbania where he retired, taking with him one of Maltese football's legends, Carmel Busuttil.

As a coach, he trained some of the major teams in the province of Verbano-Cusio-Ossola, winning a League and the Italian Cup (Coppa Italia) with the 'Gravellona'. Since January 2008 Adelmo Paris is the coach of Vaprio in the Promotion Piedmont league.

References

External links
 Adelmo Paris at AIA Cnovaravco

Living people
Italian footballers
Bologna F.C. 1909 players
Brescia Calcio players
Żurrieq F.C. players
1954 births
Association football defenders